The Neptune Avenue station is a station on the IND Culver Line of the New York City Subway, located in Coney Island, Brooklyn, at the intersection of Neptune Avenue and West 6th Street. It is served by the F train at all times and the <F> train during rush hours in the peak direction.

History 
This station opened on May 1, 1920, as part of an extension of the BMT Culver Line from Avenue X to Coney Island–Stillwell Avenue, completing the line. This was the last of the four lines to Coney Island, and upon its opening the Brooklyn Rapid Transit Company (BRT) was forced to cut the fare to Coney Island from ten to five cents.

In 2002, it was announced that Neptune Avenue would be one of ten subway stations citywide to receive renovations. The station was closed on September 8, 2002 in conjunction with the reconstruction of the Coney Island–Stillwell Avenue terminal, and service was restored on May 23, 2004. The renovation took place during the temporary closure.

In 2019, the MTA announced that this station would become ADA-accessible as part of the agency's 2020–2024 Capital Program.

Station layout 

This elevated station has one island platform and two tracks. The platform has a brown canopy with green frames and support columns in the center and black lampposts at either end. The station signs are in the standard black plates with white lettering.

The 2004 artwork here is called Looking Up by Michael Krondl. It features stained glass panels on four of the station's sign structures depicting images related to Coney Island, including the Coney Island Cyclone.

The original name of this station was Van Sicklen, named for the family that owned the property through which the original surface right-of-way passed, and that operated the Van Sicklen Hotel at the location. The name was changed to Neptune Avenue in 1995.

Exits
This station has one elevated station-house beneath the center of the platform and tracks. Two staircases from the platform go down to a landing, where a set of doors for each one leads to two more staircases that go down to the mezzanine. The mezzanine has a turnstile bank, exit-only turnstile, token booth, and two staircases going down to either side of West Sixth Street north of Neptune Avenue.

References

External links 

 
 Station Reporter — F Train
 The Subway Nut — Neptune Avenue Pictures
 MTA's Arts For Transit — Neptune Avenue (IND Culver Line)
 Entrance from Google Maps Street View
 Platform from Google Maps Street View

IND Culver Line stations
BMT Culver Line stations
New York City Subway stations in Brooklyn
Railway stations in the United States opened in 1920
1920 establishments in New York City
Coney Island